FC Hirnyk Kryvyi Rih is a Ukrainian football club based in Kryvyi Rih. The club adapted its name in 2003 and originally as "Gornyak" (in Russian). Later the club's name was changed to Hirnyk (in Ukrainian).

In August 2020, the main team was restructured as FC Kryvbas Kryvyi Rih, and U-19 team became the main team of Hirnyk. The teams played in the 2020–21 Ukrainian First League U–19 Championship.

History
It is part of the Sports Club Hirnyk which combines several other sections. The club's owner is the Kryvyi Rih Iron Ore Works (KZRK), the biggest subterranean iron mining company in Ukraine. KZRK traces its origin from the Soviet industrial giant "Kryvbas Ruda" (1973–1998). The club was created in 1998 as FC Rodina Kryvyi Rih, but it traces its history to 1925 as FC Karl Liebknecht Quarry.

The modern football club currently competes in the Ukrainian First League and was formed in 2001. After finishing 3rd in the Ukrainian Amateur Championships in 2003 the club's administration decided to enter the professional leagues.

The club plays their games at either "Shakhta Zhovtneva" or "Budivelnyk" stadiums.

The club was promoted to the Ukrainian First League after finishing 4th in 2014.

Unfortunately the club withdrew from the PFL at the end of the 2015–16 season. After a year's absence the club competed in the Ukrainian Amateur competition and in regained professional status for the 2018–19 season.

In August 2020, the main team was transformed into FC Kryvbas Kryvyi Rih which was brought back to professional football. The Hirnyk U-19 team became the main team of Hirnyk. The teams played in the 2020–21 Ukrainian First League U–19 Championship.

League and cup history

{|class="wikitable"
|-bgcolor="#efefef"
! Season
! Div.
! Pos.
! Pl.
! W
! D
! L
! GS
! GA
! P
!Domestic Cup
!colspan=2|Europe
!Notes
|-
|align=center colspan=14|competitive record of the club during the Soviet period is unknown
|-
|align=center colspan=14|Kryvbas-Ruda Kryvyi Rih
|-bgcolor=SteelBlue
|align=center|1994-95
|align=center|4th
|align=center|11
|align=center|32
|align=center|14
|align=center|5
|align=center|13
|align=center|40
|align=center|29
|align=center|47
|align=center|
|align=center|
|align=center|
|align=center|
|-bgcolor=SteelBlue
|align=center|1996-97
|align=center|4th
|align=center|x
|align=center|
|align=center|
|align=center|
|align=center|
|align=center|
|align=center|
|align=center|0
|align=center|
|align=center|
|align=center|
|align=center|withdrew before the start of season
|-
|align=center colspan=14|information about the club is scarce for 1997–2000
|-
|align=center colspan=14|renamed as Rodina Kryvyi Rih (Batkivshchyna)
|-bgcolor=SteelBlue
|align=center|2000
|align=center|4th
|align=center|3
|align=center|6
|align=center|2
|align=center|1
|align=center|3
|align=center|11
|align=center|11
|align=center|7
|align=center|
|align=center|
|align=center|
|align=center|
|-bgcolor=SteelBlue
|align=center|2001
|align=center|4th
|align=center|3
|align=center|6
|align=center|3
|align=center|0
|align=center|3
|align=center|5
|align=center|7
|align=center|9
|align=center|
|align=center|
|align=center|
|align=center|withdrew
|-bgcolor=SteelBlue
|align=center|2002
|align=center|4th
|align=center|3
|align=center|7
|align=center|3
|align=center|0
|align=center|4
|align=center|7
|align=center|12
|align=center|9
|align=center|
|align=center|
|align=center|
|align=center|
|-
|align=center colspan=14|renamed back to as Hirnyk Kryvyi Rih
|-bgcolor=SteelBlue
|align=center rowspan=3|2003
|align=center rowspan=3|4th
|align=center|1
|align=center|8
|align=center|5
|align=center|2
|align=center|1
|align=center|19
|align=center|8
|align=center|17
|align=center rowspan=3|
|align=center rowspan=3|
|align=center rowspan=3|
|align=center rowspan=3|
|-bgcolor=SteelBlue
|align=center|3
|align=center|8
|align=center|3
|align=center|4
|align=center|1
|align=center|14
|align=center|11
|align=center|13
|-bgcolor=SteelBlue
|align=center|3
|align=center|5
|align=center|2
|align=center|2
|align=center|1
|align=center|8
|align=center|5
|align=center|8
|-bgcolor=SteelBlue
|align=center|2004
|align=center|4th
|align=center|1
|align=center|6
|align=center|3
|align=center|1
|align=center|2
|align=center|11
|align=center|11
|align=center|10
|align=center|
|align=center|
|align=center|
|align=center bgcolor=lightgreen|Withdrew
|-bgcolor=PowderBlue
|align=center|2004–05
|align=center|3rd "B"
|align=center|13
|align=center|26
|align=center|7
|align=center|6
|align=center|13
|align=center|21
|align=center|25
|align=center|27
|align=center|Did not enter
|align=center|
|align=center|
|align=center|
|-bgcolor=PowderBlue
|align=center|2005–06
|align=center|3rd "B"
|align=center|11
|align=center|28
|align=center|7
|align=center|11
|align=center|10
|align=center|23
|align=center|34
|align=center|32
|align=center| finals
|align=center|
|align=center|
|align=center|
|-bgcolor=PowderBlue
|align=center|2006–07
|align=center|3rd "B"
|align=center|6
|align=center|28
|align=center|13
|align=center|5
|align=center|10
|align=center|46
|align=center|41
|align=center|44
|align=center| finals
|align=center|
|align=center|
|align=center|
|-bgcolor=PowderBlue
|align=center|2007–08
|align=center|3rd "B"
|align=center|14
|align=center|34
|align=center|9
|align=center|10
|align=center|15
|align=center|43
|align=center|51
|align=center|37
|align=center|Did not enter
|align=center|
|align=center|
|align=center|
|-bgcolor=PowderBlue
|align=center|2008–09
|align=center|3rd "B"
|align=center|10
|align=center|34
|align=center|12
|align=center|11
|align=center|11
|align=center|37
|align=center|33
|align=center|47
|align=center| finals
|align=center|
|align=center|
|align=center|–6
|-bgcolor=PowderBlue
|align=center|2009–10
|align=center|3rd "B"
|align=center|9
|align=center|26
|align=center|8
|align=center|4
|align=center|14
|align=center|29
|align=center|43
|align=center|28
|align=center| finals
|align=center|
|align=center|
|align=center|
|-bgcolor=PowderBlue
|align=center|2010–11
|align=center|3rd "B"
|align=center|5
|align=center|22
|align=center|10
|align=center|5
|align=center|7
|align=center|32
|align=center|26
|align=center|35
|align=center| finals
|align=center|
|align=center|
|align=center|
|-bgcolor=PowderBlue
|align=center|2011–12
|align=center|3rd "B"
|align=center|4
|align=center|26
|align=center|16
|align=center|3
|align=center|7
|align=center|44
|align=center|22
|align=center|51
|align=center| finals
|align=center|
|align=center|
|align=center|
|-bgcolor=PowderBlue
|align=center rowspan="2"|2012–13
|align=center rowspan="2"|3rd
|align=center|7
|align=center|24 	 	
|align=center|10 		
|align=center|7 	
|align=center|7 		
|align=center|35 	
|align=center|26
|align=center|37
|align=center rowspan=2| finals
|align=center|
|align=center|
|align=center|Group B
|-bgcolor=PowderBlue
|align=center|1
|align=center|8	
|align=center|4 		
|align=center|1 			
|align=center|3 	 	
|align=center|14 	 	
|align=center|11
|align=center|13
|align=center|
|align=center|
|align=center|Group 4
|-bgcolor=PowderBlue
|align=center|2013–14
|align=center|3rd
|align=center|4
|align=center|36
|align=center|20
|align=center|10
|align=center|6
|align=center|49
|align=center|36
|align=center|70
|align=center| finals
|align=center|
|align=center|
|align=center bgcolor=lightgreen|Promoted
|-bgcolor=LightCyan
|align=center|2014–15
|align=center|2nd
|align=center|9
|align=center|30
|align=center|10
|align=center|12
|align=center|8
|align=center|32
|align=center|26
|align=center|42
|align=center| finals
|align=center|
|align=center|
|align=center|
|-bgcolor=LightCyan
|align=center|2015–16
|align=center|2nd
|align=center|6
|align=center|30 	
|align=center|13 	
|align=center|10 	
|align=center|7 	
|align=center|39 	
|align=center|27 	
|align=center|49
|align=center| finals
|align=center|
|align=center|
|align=center bgcolor=pink|Withdrew 
|-bgcolor=white
|align=center|2016–17
|align=center colspan=13|Club is idle
|-bgcolor=SteelBlue
|align=center|2017–18
|align=center|4th "3"
|align=center|5
|align=center|16 	
|align=center|6 	
|align=center|2 	
|align=center|8 	
|align=center|44 	
|align=center|35 	
|align=center|20
|align=center|
|align=center|
|align=center|
|align=center bgcolor=lightgreen|Applied
|-bgcolor=PowderBlue
|align=center|2018–19
|align=center|3rd
|align=center bgcolor=tan|3
|align=center|27
|align=center|15
|align=center|6
|align=center|6
|align=center|53
|align=center|33
|align=center|51
|align=center| finals
|align=center|
|align=center|
|align=center|
|-bgcolor=PowderBlue
| align="center" |2019–20
| align="center" |3rd "B"
| align="center" |4
| align="center" |20
| align="center" |10
| align="center" |3
| align="center" |7
| align="center" |33
| align="center" |22
| align="center" |33
| align="center" | finals
| align="center" |
| align="center" |
| align="center" |
|-
|align=center colspan=14|The main team restructured as FC Kryvbas Kryvyi Rih, and the U-19 team became the main team of Hirnyk
|}

Notes

References

External links

 FC "Hirnyk" (Kryvyi Rih) official website

 
Amateur football clubs in Ukraine
Football clubs in Kryvyi Rih
SC Hirnyk Kryvyi Rih
Mining association football teams in Ukraine
Association football clubs established in 1925
1925 establishments in Ukraine